is a Japanese former baseball player. He has played in Nippon Professional Baseball (NPB) for the Yokohama DeNA BayStars.

Career
Yokohama BayStars selected Matsui with the seventh selection in the 2011 NPB draft.

On April 27, 2014, Matsui made his NPB debut.

On December 26, 2020, Matsui announced his retirement.

References

External links

 NPB.com

1991 births
Living people
Baseball people from Osaka
Japanese baseball players
Nippon Professional Baseball infielders
Yokohama DeNA BayStars players